The following is a list of the 50 municipalities (comuni) of the Province of Vibo Valentia, Calabria, Italy.

List

See also
List of municipalities of Italy

References

Vibo Valentia